Mizdej-e Sofla Rural District is in Junqan District of Farsan County, Chaharmahal and Bakhtiari province, Iran. At the census of 2006, its population was 23,944 in 5,358 households, when it was in the Central District. There were 11,053 inhabitants in 3,062 households at the following census of 2011, by which time it was in the recently formed Junqan District. At the most recent census of 2016, the population of the rural district was 4,049 in 1,193 households. Its only village was Karan, with 4,049 people.

References 

Farsan County

Rural Districts of Chaharmahal and Bakhtiari Province

Populated places in Chaharmahal and Bakhtiari Province

Populated places in Farsan County